Robert Earl Hames (January 22, 1920 – September 6, 1998) was an American jazz guitarist from Texas who played with the dance orchestras of Jan Garber, Orrin Tucker, and Stan Keller. In the early 1950s he was a staff guitarist for live productions at WFAA-TV, a Dallas–Fort Worth broadcaster. Down Beat magazine rated Hames as one of the top ten guitarists in the US.

Growing up
Hames was born January 22, 1920, in Wolfe City, Texas, to Joseph Irl Hames and Jessie Lynn Hames, née Kiser.

Education and early professional career 
Hames graduated from Wolfe City High School in Texas in 1937.

In the mid-1940s Hames was a member of the Jan Garber Orchestra and the Orrin Tucker band before enrolling at the University of North Texas. In 1945 he enrolled at the University of North Texas College of Music. While there, he played electric guitar in 1945 with the Aces of Collegeland, the forerunner to the One O'Clock Lab Band.  He also taught guitar on and off campus.  One of his high-school students, Jack Petersen, went on to become a well-known jazz educator and jazz guitarist. Hames introduced Petersen to jazz recordings of Karl Kress, Tal Farlow, Chuck Wayne, Herb Ellis (then a student at North Texas), Barney Kessel, Barry Galbraith, Remo Palmieri, Oscar Moore, and Charlie Christian.

While a student at North Texas in 1946, Hames was one of eight student musicians from North Texas to guest star on Interstate's weekly musical radio show, 3:30, Sunday, April 14, 1946, aired on WFAA.  Betty Cooper (vocalist) featured with the Blue Notes, a quartet composed of Lynn McClain, June Heitt, Bonnye Williams, and Elsie Mae Cooper.  Bob Hames (electric guitar), Jim Bob Floyd (piano), and Bill Meeks (clarinet) were featured as a trio. Hames was a guitarist on the Jerry Haynes Show on WFAA TV in the mid-1950s, which aired Monday through Friday at noon.

In 1951 Hames received a bachelor of music from the University of North Texas College of Music and during the early 1950s Hames also played guitar for several well-known bands, including Stan Keller and His Orchestra.

Hames also had a music store in Greenville, Texas, on Washington Street. He died in Texas in 1998.

Selected compositions 
Music and lyrics by Bob Hames except where noted

Family 
Robert Earl Hames was married twice:

 On December 31, 1942, he married Billye Mildred Goin (August 24, 1921, Bailey, Texas – January 11, 1972, buried Mount Carmel Cemetery, Wolfe City, Texas). Bob and Billye had a son, Robert Barry Hames (born 1945, Denton County, Texas), who is a Doctor of Osteopathic Medicine in Fort Worth, Texas, and is married to Ellen Mary Hames (née Erickson).
 On August 30, 1975, he married Helen Juanita Bullard (August 30, 1928 – March 4, 1993) in Tarrant County, Texas. Helen had three daughters and a son by a prior marriage to Claude Marvin Hodge, all of whom were adults in 1975.

References

American jazz guitarists
Swing guitarists
University of North Texas College of Music alumni
People from Wolfe City, Texas
1920 births
1998 deaths
20th-century American guitarists
Guitarists from Texas
American male guitarists
Jazz musicians from Texas
20th-century American male musicians
American male jazz musicians